The Workers Party (Reconstituted) of Bangladesh was a political party in Bangladesh. In February 2010, it merged into the Communist Party of Bangladesh (CPB), and its leader, Haider Akbar Khan Rano, was elected to the CPB presidium.

New Age, in May and October 2010, described Abdus Sattar as a leader of the party.

Notes

References

Further reading
 

Communist parties in Bangladesh